The 2000 Women's Junior Pan American Championship was the 4th edition of the Pan American Junior Championship, the women's international under-21 field hockey championship of the Americas organized by the Pan American Hockey Federation.

The tournament was at the Sir Garfield Sports Complex in Bridgetown, Barbados, from 13–23 April. 

Argentina were the defending champions, and successfully defended their title with a 5–0 win over the United States in the final. Canada finished in third place, defeating Chile 3–2 in penalties following a 0–0 draw.

Results

Preliminary round

Pool A

Pool B

Classification round

Fifth to eighth place classification

Crossover

Seventh and eighth place

Fifth and sixth place

First to fourth place classification

Semi-finals

Third and fourth place

Final

Final standings
Note: as Argentina qualified for the 2001 FIH Junior World Cup as the host nation, Chile took the remaining entry quota as the next highest ranked team.

References

External links
Pan American Hockey Federation

Women's Pan-Am Junior Championship
Pan American Junior Championship
International field hockey competitions hosted by Barbados
Pan American Junior Championship
Sport in Bridgetown
21st century in Bridgetown
Pan American Junior Championship